Michael D. Harrington (born October 24, 1953) is an American engineer and politician serving as a member of the New Hampshire House of Representatives for the Strafford 3 district. He previously served in the House from 2000 to 2004.

Early life and education 
Harrington was born in Medford, Massachusetts. He earned a Bachelor of Science degree in nuclear engineering from the University of Massachusetts Lowell in 1976.

Career 
Harrington worked as an engineer at the Norfolk Naval Shipyard from 1978 to 1980 and the Marble Hill Nuclear Power Plant from 1980 to 1983. From 1983 to 2004, Harrington worked as an engineering supervisor at the Seabrook Station Nuclear Power Plant. Harrington has also worked as an independent consultant and civilian engineer for the United States Navy. Harrington was appointed to the New Hampshire Public Utilities Commission in 2012 and served until 2013.

Harrington served as a member of the New Hampshire House of Representatives from 2000 to 2004 and was again elected in 2016.

References 

Living people
American engineers
Engineers from Massachusetts
Engineers from New Hampshire
University of Massachusetts Lowell alumni
American nuclear engineers
Republican Party members of the New Hampshire House of Representatives
People from Medford, Massachusetts
People from Strafford, New Hampshire
1953 births